Sonia Sanchez (born Wilsonia Benita Driver; September 9, 1934) is an American poet, writer, and professor. She was a leading figure in the Black Arts Movement and has written over a dozen books of poetry, as well as short stories, critical essays, plays, and children's books. In the 1960s, Sanchez released poems in periodicals targeted towards African-American audiences, and published her debut collection, Homecoming, in 1969. In 1993, she received Pew Fellowship in the Arts, and in 2001 was awarded the Robert Frost Medal for her contributions to the canon of American poetry. She has been influential to other African-American  poets, including Krista Franklin.

Early life
Sanchez was born in Birmingham, Alabama, on September 9, 1934 to Wilson L. Driver and Lena Jones Driver. Her mother died when Sanchez was only one year old, so she spent several years being shuttled back and forth among relatives. One of those was her grandmother, who died when Sanchez was six. The death of her grandmother proved to be a trying time in her life. Though only six, Sanchez suffered from the loss of her loved one, developing a stutter that contributed to her becoming introverted. However, her stutter only caused her to read more and more and pay close attention to language and its sounds.

In 1943, she moved to Harlem in New York City to live with her father (a school teacher), her sister, and her stepmother, who was her father's third wife. When in Harlem, she learned to manage her stutter and excelled in school, finding her poetic voice, which later emerged during her studies at Hunter College. Sanchez focused on the sound of her poetry, admitting to always reading it aloud, and received praise for her use of the full range of African and African-American vocal resources. She is known for her sonic range and dynamic public readings. She now terms herself as an "ordained stutterer.” Sanchez earned a BA in political science in 1955 from Hunter College.

Sanchez pursued post-graduate studies at New York University (NYU), working closely with Louise Bogan. During her time at NYU, she formed a writers' workshop in Greenwich Village, where the "Broadside Quartet" was born. The "Broadside Quartet" included other prominent Black Arts Movement artists such as Haki Madhubuti, Nikki Giovanni and Etheridge Knight. These young poets were introduced and promoted by Dudley Randall, an established poet and publisher.

Although her first marriage to Albert Sanchez did not last, Sonia Sanchez would retain her professional name. She and Albert had one daughter named Anita. She later married Etheridge Knight, had twin sons named Morani Neusi and Mungu Neusi, but they divorced after two years. Nonetheless, motherhood heavily influenced the motifs of her poetry in the 1970s, with the bonds between mother and child emerging as a key theme. She also has three grandchildren.

Teaching 
Sanchez taught 5th Grade in NYC at the Downtown Community School, until 1967. She has taught as a professor at eight universities and has lectured at more than 500 college campuses across the US, including Howard University. She was also a leader in the effort to establish the discipline of Black Studies at university level. In 1966, while teaching at San Francisco State University, she introduced Black Studies courses. Sanchez was the first to create and teach a course based on Black Women and literature in the United States and the course she offered on African-American literature is generally considered the first of its kind taught at a predominantly white university. She viewed the discipline of Black Studies as both a new platform for the study of race and a challenge to the institutional biases of American universities. These efforts are clearly in line with the goals of the Black Arts Movement, and she was a known Black feminist. Sanchez was the first Presidential Fellow at Temple University, where she began working in 1977. There, she held the Laura Carnell chair until her retirement in 1999. She is currently a poet-in-residence at Temple University. She has read her poetry in Africa, the Caribbean, China, Australia, Europe, Nicaragua, and Canada.

Activism 
Sanchez supports the National Black United Front and was a very influential part of the Civil Rights Movement and the Black Arts Movement. In the early 1960s, Sanchez became a member of CORE (Congress for Racial Equality), where she met Malcolm X. Though she was originally an integrationist in her thinking, after hearing Malcolm X speak Sanchez became more separatist in her thinking and focused more on her black heritage and identity.

In 1972, Sanchez joined the Nation of Islam, during which time she published A Blues Book for Blue Black Magical Women (1974), but she left the organization after three years, in 1975. because their views on women's rights conflicted. She continues to advocate for the rights of oppressed women and minority groups.
She wrote many plays and books that had to do with the struggles and lives of Black America. Among her plays are Sister Son/ji, which was first produced Off-Broadway at the New York Shakespeare Festival Public Theater in 1972; Uh, Huh: But How Do it Free us?, staged in Chicago at the Northwestern University Theatre in 1975, and Malcolm Man/Don’t Live Here No Mo’, first produced in 1979 at the ASCOM Community Center in Philadelphia. Sanchez has edited two anthologies of Black literature: We Be Word Sorcerers: 25 Stories by Black Americans (1974) and 360° of Blackness Coming at You (1999). She is also committed to a variety of activist causes, including the Brandywine Peace Community, MADRE, and Plowshares.

Black Arts Movement 
The aim of the Black Arts Movement was a renewal of black will, insight, energy, and awareness. Sanchez published poetry and essays in numerous periodicals in the 1960s, including The Liberator, Negro Digest, and Black Dialogue. Her writing established her importance as a political thinker to the "black aesthetic" program. Sanchez gained a reputation as an important voice in the Black Arts Movement after publishing the book of poems Homecoming in 1969. This collection and her second in 1970, titled We a BaddDDD People, demonstrated her use of experimental poetic forms to discuss the development of black nationalism and identity.

Style and themes
Sanchez is known for her innovative melding of musical formats—such as the blues—and traditional poetic formats like haiku and tanka. She also uses spelling to celebrate the unique sound of black English, for which she gives credit to poets such as Langston Hughes and Sterling Brown.

Her first collection of poems, Homecoming (1969), is known for its blues influences in both form and content. The collection describes both the struggle of defining black identity in the United States as well as the many causes for celebration Sanchez sees in black culture. Her second book, We a BaddDDD People (1970), solidifies her contribution to the Black Arts Movement aesthetic by focusing on the everyday lives of black men and women. These poems make use of urban black vernacular, experimental punctuation, spelling, and spacing, and the performative quality of jazz.

Though still emphasizing what she sees as the need for revolutionary cultural change, Sanchez's later works, such as I've Been a Woman (1978), Homegirls and Handgrenades (1985), and Under a Soprano Sky (1987), tend to focus less on separatist themes (like those of Malcolm X), and more on themes of love, community, and empowerment. She continues to explores the haiku, tanka, and sonku forms, as well as blues-influenced rhythms. Later works continue her experiments with forms such as the epic in Does Your House Have Lions? (1997), an emotional account of her brother's deadly struggle with AIDS, and the haiku in Morning Haiku (2010).

In addition to her poetry, Sanchez's contributions to the Black Arts Movement included drama and prose. She began writing plays while in San Francisco in the 1960s. Several of her plays challenge the masculinist spirit of the movement, focusing on strong female protagonists. Sanchez has been recognized as a pioneering champion of black feminism.

Contemporary works 
Her more recent contemporary endeavors include a spoken-word interlude on "Hope is an Open Window", a song co-written by Diana Ross from her 1998 album Every Day is a New Day. The song is featured as the sound bed for a tribute video to 9/11 that can be viewed on YouTube. Sanchez is currently among 20 African-American women to be a part of "Freedom's Sisters," a mobile exhibition initiated by the Cincinnati Museum Center and the Smithsonian Institution.

Sanchez became Philadelphia's first Poet Laureate, after being appointed by Mayor Michael Nutter. She served in that position from 2012 to 2014.

In 2013 Sanchez headlined the 17th annual Poetry Ink at which she read her poem "Under a Soprano Sky".

BaddDDD Sonia Sanchez, a documentary film by Barbara Attie, Janet Goldwater and Sabrina Schmidt Gordon spotlighting Sanchez's work, career, influence and life story, was released in 2015 when it was shown at the Full Frame Documentary Film Festival The film premiered in the UK on June 22, 2016, at Rivington Place.

Awards
In 1969, Sanchez was awarded the P.E.N. Writing Award. She was awarded the National Education Association Award 1977–1988. She won the National Academy and Arts Award and the National Endowment for the Arts Fellowship Award in 1978–79. In 1985, she received the American Book Award for Homegirls and Handgrenades. She has also been awarded the Community Service Award from the National Black Caucus of State Legislators, the Lucretia Mott Award, the Governor's Award for Excellence in the Humanities, and the Peace and Freedom Award from the Women's International League for Peace and Freedom, as well as the 1999 Langston Hughes Poetry Award, the 2001 Robert Frost Medal, the 2004 Harper Lee Award, and the 2006 National Visionary Leadership Award. In 2009, she received the Robert Creeley Award, from the Robert Creeley Foundation.

In 2017 Sanchez was honored at the 16th Annual Dr. Betty Shabazz Awards in a ceremony held on June 29 at the Schomburg Center for Research in Black Culture, Harlem.

In 2018, she won the Wallace Stevens Award from the Academy of American Poets for proven mastery in the art of poetry.

At the 84th Annual Anisfield-Wolf Book Awards ceremony on September 26, 2019, Sanchez was honored with the Lifetime Achievement Award by the Cleveland Foundation.

In October 2021, Sanchez was awarded the 28th annual Dorothy and Lillian Gish Prize "in recognition of her ongoing achievements in inspiring change through the power of the word."

In 2022, Sanchez was awarded The Edward MacDowell Medal by The MacDowell Colony for outstanding contributions to American culture

Selected bibliography
Poetry
 Homecoming, Broadside Press, 1969
 We a Baddddd People (1970), Broadside Press, 1973
 Love Poems, Third Press, 1973
 A Blues Book for a Blue Black Magic Woman, Broadside Press, 1974
 Autumn Blues: New Poems, Africa World Press, 1994, 
 Continuous Fire: A Collection of Poetry, 1994, 
 Shake Down Memory: A Collection of Political Essays and Speeches, Africa World Press, 1991, 
 It's a New Day: Poems for Young Brothas and Sistuhs (1971)
 Homegirls and Handgrenades (1985) (reprint White Pine Press, 2007)
 Under a Soprano Sky, Africa World Press, 1987, 
 I've Been a Woman: New and Selected Poems, Third World Press, 1985, 
 Wounded in the House of a Friend, Beacon Press, 1995, 
 Does Your House have Lions?, Beacon Press, 1997, 
 Like the Singing Coming Off of Drums, Beacon Press, 1998
 
 Ash (2001)
 Bum Rush the Page: A Def Poetry Jam (2001)
 
 Collected Poems (2021)

Plays
 Black Cats and Uneasy Landings (1995)
 I'm Black When I'm Singing, I'm Blue When I Ain't (1982)
 The Bronx is Next (1970)
 Sista Son/Ji (1972)
 Uh Huh, But How Do It Free Us? (1975)
 Malcolm Man/Don't Live Here No More (1979)
I'm Black When I'm Singing, I'm Blue When I Ain't and Other Plays (Duke University Press, 2010)

Short-story collections
 A Sound Investment and Other Stories (1979)

Children's books 
 It's a New Day (1971)
 A Sound Investment
 The Adventures of Fat Head, Small Head, and Square Head, The Third Press, 1973, 

Anthologies
 (Editor) We Be Word Sorcerers: 25 Stories by Black Americans (1974)
 (Editor) 360 Degrees of Blackness Coming at You! (1999)
 (Contributor) Margaret Busby, ed. (1992), Daughters of Africa: An International Anthology of Words and Writings by Women of African Descent from the Ancient Egyptian to the Present.
 (Contributor) 
 (Contributor) 
 (Contributor) 

Interviews

Discography
A Sun Lady for All Seasons Reads Her Poetry (Folkways Records, 1971)
Every Tone a Testimony (Smithsonian Folkways, 2001)

See also

 Mumia Abu-Jamal

References

External links

Sonia Sanchez Collection at Boston University
Academy of American Poets

Sonia Sanchez Biography at Voices from the Gap
Joyce Joyce and John Reilly, Approaches to teaching Sonia Sanchez's poetry
Sonia Sanchez Biography at Speak Out
Sonia Sanchez article at the Heath Anthology of American Literature
Sonia Sanchez's oral history video excerpts at The National Visionary Leadership Project

African-American poets
English-language haiku poets
African-American dramatists and playwrights
Activists for African-American civil rights
American anti-war activists
Political activists from Pennsylvania
Hunter College alumni
Howard University alumni
Temple University faculty
Writers from Birmingham, Alabama
1934 births
Living people
Pew Fellows in the Arts
American women poets
American women dramatists and playwrights
African-American short story writers
American short story writers
20th-century American poets
20th-century short story writers
20th-century American dramatists and playwrights
20th-century American women writers
Former Nation of Islam members
American Book Award winners
Black Arts Movement writers
Poets Laureate of Philadelphia
Municipal Poets Laureate in the United States
American women academics
Women civil rights activists
20th-century African-American women writers
20th-century African-American writers
21st-century African-American people
21st-century African-American women